David Friesen (born May 6, 1942 in Tacoma, Washington) is an American jazz bassist. He plays double bass and electric upright bass.

Career 
Friesen began playing bass while serving in the United States Army in Germany. He played with John Handy and Marian McPartland and following this, with Joe Henderson; in 1975, he toured in Europe with Billy Harper. His first album as a session leader appeared that year. In 1976, he began collaborating with guitarist John Stowell; the pair would work together often. He appeared with Ted Curson at the Monterey Jazz Festival in 1977. Following this, he worked with Ricky Ford, Duke Jordan, Mal Waldron, and Paul Horn. His 1989 album Other Times, Other Places reached No. 11 on the U.S. Billboard Top Jazz Albums chart. He has also played with Chick Corea, Michael Brecker, Stan Getz, Dexter Gordon, Kenny Garrett, Dizzy Gillespie, and Mal Waldron.

Personal life 
He is the younger brother of actress Dyan Cannon, and the uncle of actress Jennifer Grant. He is the son of Ashkenazi Jewish mother Claire (née Portnoy) and Russian Mennonite father Ben Friesen.

Discography

As leader
 Color Pool (Muse, 1975)
 Star Dance (Inner City, 1976)
 Waterfall Rainbow (Inner City, 1977)
 Through the Listening Glass (Inner City, 1978)
 Other Mansions (Inner City, 1979)
 Paths Beyond Tracing (SteepleChase, 1980)
 Heart to Heart (Golden Flute, 1980)
 Storyteller (Muse, 1981)
 Yet to Come (with Linc Chamberland) (Muse, 1981)
 Voices (Westwind, 1983)
 Amber Skies (Palo Alto, 1983)
 Encounters with Mal Waldron (Muse, 1984)
 Inner Voices (Global Pacific, 1987)
 Other Times, Other Places (Global Pacific, 1989)
 Departure (Global Pacific, 1990)
 Long Trip Home (1992)
 Two for the Show (Summit, 1994)
 1 2 3 (1994)
 Remembering the Moment (Soul Note, 1994)
 The Spirit of Christmas (1994)
 Returning (1995)
 Dancing with the Bass (1995)
 Three to Get Ready (Summit, 1995)
 Upon the Swing (Shamrock, 1996)
 Four to Go (1996)
 Facing the Wind (1996)
 Still Waters (1997)
 Ancient Kings (1998)
 Tomorrow's Dream (1998)
 Castles and Flags (1999)
 Live at Jazz Bakery (1999)
 In Concert (Summit, 2000)
 Made in Berlin (2000)
 With You in Mind (2001)
 The Name of a Woman (2002)
 Grace (2002)
 Midnight Mood: Live in Stockholm (Intuition, 2004)
 Connection (Itm, 2006)
 Christmas at Woodstock (West Wind, 2006)
 Made in Istanbul (2006)
 Textures (2014; with Christian Hassenstein, Joost Lijbaart)
 Where the Light Falls (Origin, 2014)
 Bactrian (Origin, 2015)
 Triple Exposure (Origin, 2016)
 Structures (Origin, 2017)
 Another Time Another Place (Rattle, 2017)
 My Faith, My Life (Origin 2018)
 Interaction  (Origin 2019)
 Testimony  (Origin 2020)
 Passage  (Origin 2021)
 Day of Rest (Origin 2021)

As sideman
With Ted Curson
 Jubilant Power (Inner City, 1976)
 Snake Johnson (Chiaroscuro, 1981)
With Kenny Drew
 Ruby, My Dear (SteepleChase, 1977)
With Ricky Ford
 Manhattan Plaza (Muse, 1978)
With Billy Harper
 Black Saint (Black Saint, 1975)
With Duke Jordan
 Duke's Artistry (SteepleChase, 1978)
 The Great Session (SteepleChase, 1978 [1981])
With Mal Waldron
 One Entrance, Many Exits (Palo Alto, 1982)

References

External links
 Official Home Page

American jazz double-bassists
Male double-bassists
Jewish American musicians
American Mennonites
Mennonite musicians
Musicians from Washington (state)
1942 births
Living people
Muse Records artists
SteepleChase Records artists
People from Tacoma, Washington
Inner City Records artists
Jewish jazz musicians
21st-century double-bassists
21st-century American male musicians
American male jazz musicians
Summit Records artists
Origin Records artists
Jazz musicians from Washington (state)
21st-century American Jews